Dungeons & Dragons: The Fantasy Adventure Board Game, released in 2002 by Parker Brothers, a division of Hasbro, is based on the role-playing game Dungeons & Dragons (D&D) by Wizards of the Coast. The game is distributed in the European market only.

Gameplay
The game is similar to a dungeon crawl from the game D&D, although there is no role-playing involved.  Player characters are pre-generated and there are no non-weapon proficiencies. While the quests are pre-determined in a booklet, an empty map framework is included, allowing users to make their own.

Instead of polyhedral dice, the game uses 6 Attack dice, 1 reveal traps die, 1 disarm traps die, 1 special die and 1 turn undead die.

The player can choose one of the four heroes, each with their own special abilities.

Expansions

Two expansions to the core game are available:

Forbidden Forest Expansion
First published 2004. Players from the first core game have to join forces with an old friend, Orwick, to find and defeat Orwick's druid brother-gone-evil Elwick and the Yuan-Ti, a race of snake-men in the Forest.

Eternal Winter Expansion
First published 2003. The battle continues in the frozen winter wastelands. Here, vicious creatures roam the icy landscape, hunting for unprotected prey.

References

External links
 
 Review of Dungeons & Dragons Fantasy Adventure Board Game at RPGnet

Board games introduced in 2002
Dungeon crawler board games
Dungeons & Dragons board games
Parker Brothers games